Tirumangalam is a state assembly constituency in Madurai district in Tamil Nadu. Elections and Winners from this constituency are listed below.
It is a part of the Virudhunagar Lok Sabha constituency. It is one of the 234 State Legislative Assembly Constituencies in Tamil Nadu, in India.

Madras State

Tamil Nadu

Election Results

2021

2016

2011

2009 By-election 
Election Commission of India announced by-election for this constituency after the death of MLA. There were 156,615 registered electors in the 2009 by-election.

2006

2001

1996

1991

1989

1984

1980

1977

1971

1967

1962

1957

1952

References 

 

Assembly constituencies of Tamil Nadu
Madurai district